Alexis Javier Ferrero (born 31 March 1979) is an Argentine former football centre back who last played for San Martín Mendoza.

Club career

Ferrero started his professional career with Ferro Carril Oeste. He played for the team in the lower leagues of Argentine football until 2003 when he joined Atlanta of the Primera B Metropolitana (third division).

In 2005 Ferrero joined Tigre, helping the team to gain promotion to the Argentine Primera in 2007. The 2007 Apertura was Tigre's first season in the Primera since 1980. Ferrero played in all 19 games helping the club to finish in second place, the highest league finish in their history.

For 2008, Ferrero moved to Brazilian side Botafogo. However, he returned to Argentina on January 11, 2009, when he was loaned to Colón.

In January 2010 Ferrero joined River Plate.

International career

On 20 May 2009, Ferrero played for Argentina in a friendly match against Panama, forming part of a squad made from players based in the Argentine league. Argentina won the game 3–1.

References

External links
 Football-Lineups player profile
 Argentine Primera statistics at Fútbol XXI  
 Alexis Ferrero at Soccerway

1979 births
Living people
People from Iriondo Department
Association football central defenders
Argentine footballers
Argentina international footballers
Argentine expatriate footballers
Ferro Carril Oeste footballers
Club Atlético Atlanta footballers
Club Atlético Tigre footballers
Club Atlético Colón footballers
Club Atlético Huracán footballers
Club Atlético River Plate footballers
Rangers de Talca footballers
Botafogo de Futebol e Regatas players
San Martín de Tucumán footballers
Central Córdoba de Santiago del Estero footballers
San Luis de Quillota footballers
Chilean Primera División players
Primera B de Chile players
Argentine Primera División players
Primera Nacional players
Torneo Federal A players
Expatriate footballers in Chile
Expatriate footballers in Brazil
Sportspeople from Santa Fe Province
Central Córdoba de Santiago del Estero managers